American_women_illustrators

Louisa Bertman is a female illustrator digital activist, feminist, illustrator, animator, GIF artist and filmmaker living in Cambridge, Massachusetts. As a visual narrative artist her work pushes illustrations, gifs, animated shorts, and visual narratives in conjunction with technology and social media to advocate art for social awareness, social justice and social innovation. Her interest lies in creating art for advocacy. Whether it's GIFS focusing on Climate Awareness for The New York Times; video game characters for The National Archives Rightfully Hers exhibition, or animated shorts for NPR's WNYC Podcast series, "Caught The Lives of Juvenile Justice", Bertman's works address a range of political and social justice issues including sex, race, age, and cultural identity.  Bertman utilizes the power of visual narratives to enable activism and change. She is known for incorporating humor and extreme graphic imagery in her work. She is a  known for "untraditional portraitures of celebrities, influencers and personalities"

Personal life 
Louisa Bertman is from Newton, Massachusetts. Her parents are Richard Bertman (sculptor, author, and founding partner of CBT Architects), who has worked with her on occasion, and Sandra Bertman PhD, Ft, author, and thanatologist who pioneered applied arts and humanities in clinical, academic and public settings; founding director of University of Massachusetts Medical School's Medical Humanities program. Her two siblings include, David Bertman - a television and film director, editor, and winner of the 2017 ACE Eddie Award for the This Is Us pilot episode and Jonathan Bertman, a physician, entrepreneur and founder of Amazing Charts and Afraid To Ask.

Initially Bertman attended NYU Tisch School of the Arts, and was a professional modern dancer in New York City. She received her BFA in illustration from Parsons The New School for Design. She received an MFA in Visual Narrative from The School of Visual Arts.

Professional career 

Embracing the intersection of illustration, technology and social media, Louisa Bertman is an illustrator, GIF artist, animator, filmmaker, and producer of creative nonfiction visual narratives. Her illustrations, GIFs, and animated shorts bring attention to social awareness and social justice.

From MTA Posters for The LGBTQ Center, NYC to Podcasts for WNYC Caught the Lives of the Juvenile Justice; to female video game characters for the exhibition Rightfully Hers: American Women and the Vote for The National Archives, DC, Bertman's work appears in magazines, newspapers, podcasts, social networks, and film festivals including The New York Times, The Wall Street Journal, The Village Voice, Los Angeles Times, ESPN's The Undefeated, GQ, The Root, and The Nation.

She has created illustrations and animated GIFs of celebrities including Cardi B for The Nation; Cecile Richards, Valerie Jarrett, London Breed for LENNY; Cartalk's Tom and Ray Magliozzi for NPR's yearly calendar; Michelle Obama for BUST Magazine; Serena Williams for ESPN; Jackie Robinson, Ella Fitzgerald, Denzel Washington, Chadwick Boseman and Rob Morgan for The Undefeated; and nine power couples of social media for The New York Times.

American Idiot producer Laurence Kaye (Hop Theatricals) commissioned a signed/numbered limited edition series of 10 prints in celebration of American Idiot's opening night on Broadway.

Bertman is a 2017/18 AICAD Fellow recipient.

Bertman illustrated and animated Elegy Ending with a Cell Door Closing written and spoken by 2021 Guggenheim Fellow, Reginald Dwayne Betts.

Bertman is currently Assistant Professor of Illustration and Visual Narrative at the Lesley University College of Art + Design.

References

External links 

Living people
Artists from Newton, Massachusetts
American women illustrators
American illustrators
Tisch School of the Arts alumni
Parsons School of Design alumni
Year of birth missing (living people)